International School Brunei (ISB) is an international school split over two sites, one located in the Sungai Akar area of Bandar Seri Begawan, Brunei and the other located in Seria in the Belait district. It is the first international school to be set up in Brunei. The current executive principal is Dr Stephen Kendall-Jones. The school has four sections: pre-kindergarten, kindergarten, primary, and, secondary.

The school is one of several schools offering the Cambridge IGCSE qualification in Brunei (the national qualification is the Cambridge O Level) and is the earlier of the only two schools in the country to offer the IB Diploma.

History 
Datin Glass, a government officer's wife, started a tutorial group for her daughter and one or two friends in 1964 and taught them by means of a correspondence course sent out and marked by the South Australian Correspondence School. The numbers grew quite rapidly and by 1970 the school had moved to a site provided by the Brunei Government at 34 Tapak Kuda and was established as a department of the South Australian Correspondence Schools, known locally as the Supervision School. By February 1971 there were 30 Kindergarten pupils and 31 Primary students.

The enrollment continued to grow and by 1974 it had reached 160. In 1976 it was decided that the school should convert to a fully independent private preparatory school, employing trained teachers and the then current principal, Mrs Bennett adopted an education based on the UK primary school principles. The School became a limited company, the International School (B) Bhd on 1 December 1976. For the first time the school had a board of Directors elected from the membership of the company.

The School continued to grow and expand to such an extent that a new site was sourced and acquired in Berakas in 1978, but was unable to move because there were no funds to erect suitable buildings. By 1980 the School had 300 pupils. ISB eventually had to leave Tapak Kuda and move to its current location in Berakas having raised funds through a combination of vigorous fund raising, debentures, bank loans and royal support. The School was officially opened by HRH Princess Masna on 9 March 1986, eight years after securing the lease. Funding for development was a perennial problem and had it not been for considerable support from an anonymous donor through the setting up of a trust fund under chairmanship of Mrs Meggie Leong, development would have been very much slower.

In 1991 the school extended its provision to lower secondary students who were able to move into their own premises on the secondary site in 1993. In 2001 the School was authorised by the International Baccalaureate Organisation to offer their prestigious Diploma programme.

In 2006 a small satellite school was opened in Kuala Belait, Belait district, catering for children from Pre Kindergarten to Year 1. This school has grown and expanded so that a second, upper site was opened in September 2012 so that the school now caters for the full Primary age range from 2–11 years.

Currently ISB caters for over 1100 students ranging in age from Pre Kindergarten (two years) to IB (pre university – eighteen years). The students represent thirty seven different nationalities and a host of cultures creating a truly multicultural environment. The School values the presence of Bruneian/PR students who currently account for forty percent of the enrolment.

ISB curriculum is based on an adapted National Curriculum for England, Years up to IGCSE level followed by the International Baccalaureate Diploma programme. Students leave ISB to attend universities around the world including Oxbridge and Ivy League.

From Year 2 onwards, Bruneian children follow Brunei Government Ugama (Islamic religious instruction) requirements and may either have lessons at school (BSB only), in the afternoon, or may continue with their preferred method of instruction elsewhere. Children attend lessons Monday to Friday, after regular school lessons finish, from 1.30 to 2.45 pm. Ugama School in ISB Bandar is run by the Guru Basar (Principal Teacher) and teachers from the Ministry of Religious Affairs.

Additionally, ISB has a partnership agreement with Sunshine Coast TAFE, Australia to deliver their Community Services Early Childhood programme at Certificate III and Diploma level.

The School received international accreditation by the Council of International Schools in February 2005, is a member of the Federation of British International Schools in Asia (FOBISIA) and the East Asia Regional Council of Schools (EARCOS).

Curriculum

Upper Secondary Subject Options 
ISB classifies the subjects on offer into 3 blocks and core subjects students must take. The ISB CORE consists of English, Languages, Mathematics and Science. These are subjects that students must take. The three option blocks (X, Y & Z) are the students choice of subjects to choose from. Students are only allowed one subject from each block and they cannot pick the same one.

IB Diploma Subject Options

Notable alumni 

 Prince Abdul Azim

References

External links
 School website

British international schools in Asia
Private schools in Brunei
Cambridge schools in Brunei
Buildings and structures in Bandar Seri Begawan
Educational institutions established in 1964
1964 establishments in Brunei